Amnesia is a text adventure written by science fiction author Thomas M. Disch,  programmed by Kevin Bentley, and published by Electronic Arts in 1986 for IBM PC compatibles (as a self-booting disk) and Apple II. A Commodore 64 version was released in 1987. Disch's ironic, rich writing style is in distinct contrast to the functional or tongue-in-cheek tone of most text adventures. Over half of Disch's novel-length manuscript had to be cut from the published version due to the storage limitations 5¼" floppy disks.

Gameplay
The game begins as the player's character awakens in a midtown Manhattan hotel room with absolutely no memory.  He has no clothes and no money, and does not even remember what he looks like.  The character soon discovers he is engaged to a woman he cannot remember, a strange man is trying to kill him, and the state of Texas wants him for murder.  From here, the player must unravel the events in his life that led him to this point.

In addition to being a text adventure, the game simulates life in Manhattan. Disch's model covered every block and street corner south of 110th Street.  A hard-copy map of the streets and subways of Manhattan is included in the packaging. Players move from place to place on foot, and have to reach destinations at the correct time of day to initiate plot developments.  Stores open and close at the correct times, street lights turn on, and other aspects of New York City life are simulated.  Almost 4000 separate Manhattan locations, including 650 streets, are part of the game.

Development
Programmer Kevin Bentley implemented the game using the King Edward Adventure game authoring system, which was developed by James Terry. The game was acquired and produced by Don Daglow.

Reception
Scorpia of Computer Gaming World described the game as being "too much like a novel", giving as example the need to answer the phone in the hotel room. The review also noted the main character would collapse after an unrealistically short amount of time if he didn't eat or sleep frequently. Charles Ardai called Amnesia "a brilliant, witty, and intriguing story", however, and stated that "the text is so rich and the story so interesting that one hardly notices that this is probably the least interactive piece of interactive fiction ever made". Compute! stated that the combination of Disch's writing and Electronic Arts' software "makes Amnesia a text adventure well worth exploring".

Legacy
One of the last major text-based games published by a major games company other than Infocom, Amnesia is also the only all-text adventure ever published by EA.

Disch wrote a screenplay based on the game's characters and story line and it was optioned to one of the major Hollywood studios, but the film was never made.

References

External links
 
 Link to Disch's full manuscript for Amnesia at ascii.textfiles.com
 Amnesia packaging and artwork for Apple IIC with a link to Disch's original manuscript
 

1986 video games
1980s interactive fiction
Apple II games
Commodore 64 games
Electronic Arts games
Video games set in New York City
Video games set in the United States
Video games about amnesia
Works by Thomas M. Disch
Single-player video games